Gylling may refer to:
 Gylling (Odder Municipality), a village in Jutland, Denmark
 a Danish- and Swedish-language surname. Notable people with the surname include
 Edvard Gylling, Finnish (later Soviet) politician
 Jane Gylling, Swedish swimmer
 Johnny Gylling, Swedish politician

Danish-language surnames
Swedish-language surnames